Various national symbols of Somaliland include:

 National emblem of Somaliland
 Flag of Somaliland
 National anthem of Somaliland